Samsung Mobile Innovator is a cross platform program (Currently supporting Java, Symbian, bada and Windows Mobile 
based devices) developed by Samsung  to establish a relationship with software developers and other contributors to the mobile ecosystem in developing, testing, and distributing  mobile applications and ideas.  The relationships are established and maintained through a website, forums, a blog and social networking sites.

Overview
The program entered beta on September 1, 2008 and was
announced during the October 2008 Smartphone Show in Earls Court, London by Ho-Shoo Lee, EVP
of the Mobile Solutions center for Samsung Electronics.  At 
the launch of the program only Symbian S60 based devices were supported.  Presently Windows Mobile and Java based phones
are also supported through the program. 

The Samsung Mobile Innovator site was initially launched in English only.  On March 13, 2009 the site was expanded
to also included Chinese 

The program was rebranded as Samsung Developers in 2013.

Development and testing
While mobile devices running the same operating system will support many of the same APIs features that are specific to an OEM are generally not accessible to developers without some amount of reverse engineering. Samsung has made many of the phone specific features available to developers through documentation and an SDK giving developers the ability to control and interact with mobile device's LEDs, camera flash, accelerometer, on other device specific features that are not exposed through the operating system's APIs.

Developers can also test their applications remotely through what Samsung calls Lab.dev.   Though Lab.dev a developer can reserve time for a specific Samsung phone and remotely upload their application to the phone and interact with the phone through their browser.

Distribution and marketing
Samsung accepts business proposals through their Market.dev program.  Software publishers will be able to distribute their applications through the a Samsung Application Store.

See also
Samsung Electronics

References

External links
Samsung Developers
 Smart Phone Show PDF Slides for Mr Ho-Soo Lee's Keynote
Samsung Developers : offers a new destination for developers working with Samsung smart devices
Samsung Mobile Innovator
Software Development
Samsung Market.dev

Software developer communities